Indika Senaratne (born 5 February 1986) is a Sri Lankan cricketer. He played domestic cricket for Burgher Recreation Club and Ragama Cricket Club from 2006 to 2010, before playing for Central Districts in New Zealand in 2015/16.

References

External links
 

1986 births
Living people
Sri Lankan cricketers
Burgher Recreation Club cricketers
Central Districts cricketers
Ragama Cricket Club cricketers
Cricketers from Kandy